NEP Group, Inc. (formerly NEP Broadcasting LLC) is a Pittsburgh, Pennsylvania based and privately owned international production company that provides outsourced teleproduction services for major events throughout the world.

Its facilities are used to produce television broadcasts of the Indian Premier League, Cricket World Cup, Super Bowl, Academy Awards, Premier League, Eurovision Song Contest, Emmy Awards, The Daily Show, UEFA Champions League, Olympic Games, NASCAR, Asian Games, WWE Wrestling, FIFA World Cup, Wimbledon and French Open, Grammy Awards, U.S. Open, British Open, The People's Court, Sesame Street, The Rolling Stones, Page Six TV and Love Island (franchise).

History
The company was founded by Tom Shelburne in 1984 and was part of Scranton, Pennsylvania television station WNEP-TV (which stood for North East Pennsylvania). It was spun off after The New York Times Company bought the station in 1986 from Shelburne.  The company took off after it acquired the failing New Kensington, Pennsylvania-based TCS after the companies jointly produced the 1987 Pan American Games in Indianapolis, Indiana.

From 2007 to 2012 it was primarily owned by American Securities. In 2012 it NEP was sold to Crestview Partners.

On September 25, 2015, NEP appointed Keith Andrews (formerly CEO and managing director of NEP Australia) as Chief Operations officer of NEP Group, Inc.

On June 24, 2016, The Carlyle Group made a significant minority investment in NEP alongside existing shareholders Crestview and NEP management.

In August 2018, it was announced that Crestview were to exit NEP with The Carlyle Group purchasing their stake, giving them a majority interest as of October 19, 2018.

In August 2020, NEP Group announced that Brian Sullivan will join the company as the new CEO starting August 31.

Acquisitions

This list of acquisitions is not complete.

References

External links 
 NEP Group - Official Website

Companies based in Pittsburgh
Companies established in 1984
Television production companies of the United States
Television production companies of the United Kingdom
Private equity portfolio companies
2012 mergers and acquisitions
The Carlyle Group companies